Lane Township is one of ten townships in Warrick County, Indiana, United States. As of the 2010 census, its population was 281 and it contained 119 housing units.

History
Lane Township was formed out of Owen Township in 1859. The township was named for Joseph Lane, a state legislator.

Geography

Unincorporated towns
 Hemenway at 
 Jockey at 
 Scalesville at 
(This list is based on USGS data and may include former settlements.)

Adjacent townships
 Lockhart Township, Pike County (northeast)
 Pigeon Township (east)
 Owen Township (south)
 Hart Township (west)
 Monroe Township, Pike County (northwest)

Cemeteries
The township contains these two cemeteries: Ashby and Ebenezer.

School districts
 Warrick County School Corporation

Political districts
 Indiana's 8th congressional district
 State House District 74
 State Senate District 47

References
Sources
 United States Census Bureau 2007 TIGER/Line Shapefiles
 United States Board on Geographic Names (GNIS)
 IndianaMap
Notes

External links
 Indiana Township Association
 United Township Association of Indiana

Townships in Warrick County, Indiana
Townships in Indiana